Vincetoxicum rupicola is a species of plant in the dogbane family Apocynaceae that is endemic to Queensland, Australia. It was first described by Paul Forster in 1992 as Tylophora rupicola.

Description
The species is a slender vine with clear sap and stems up to 1 m long. The dull green, dagger-shaped leaves grow to 55 mm in length. The pink, five-petalled flowers are about 10 mm in diameter. The spindle-shaped fruits are 40 mm long.

Distribution and habitat
The species is known from the Wet Tropics of north-eastern Queensland, where it grows among grass and rocks above permanent water in grassy open forests of Allocasuarina torulosa, Eucalyptus granitica and Corymbia rhodops on granitic soils.

Conservation
The species has been listed as Endangered under Australia's EPBC Act. The main potential threats include competition from invasive weeds, consequent increases in wildfire intensity, and timber harvesting.

References

rupicola
Flora of Queensland
Gentianales of Australia
Taxa named by Paul Irwin Forster
Plants described in 1992
Vines